The following lists events that happened in 1974 in Iceland.

Incumbents
President – Kristján Eldjárn
Prime Minister – Ólafur Jóhannesson, Geir Hallgrímsson

Events
Geirfinnur case

Births

25 February – Nína Dögg Filippusdóttir, actress
27 March – Kristján Helgason, snooker player
2 May – Garðar Thór Cortes, singer
6 May – Birkir Hólm Guðnason, business leader
13 June – Selma Björnsdóttir, actress and singer
11 July – Hermann Hreiðarsson, footballer
3 September – Guðmundur Benediktsson, footballer.
17 September – Helgi Sigurðsson, footballer

Full date missing
Guðmundur Þór Kárason, puppet designer and puppeteer

Deaths
4 March – Guðni Jónsson, professor of history and editor of Old Norse texts (b. 1901)
20 April – Guðmundur Guðmundsson, chess player (b. 1918)
21 September – Sigurður Nordal, scholar, writer and ambassador (b. 1876)
8 November – Sesselja Sigmundsdottir, pioneer in the fields of pedagogy and the care for the mentally disabled (b 1902)
12 November – Þórbergur Þórðarson, author and Esperantist (b. 1888 or 1889)

References

 
1970s in Iceland
Iceland
Iceland
Years of the 20th century in Iceland